Franz Jacob Wagner (born August 27, 2001) is a German professional basketball player for the Orlando Magic of the National Basketball Association (NBA). He played college basketball for the Michigan Wolverines.

Wagner, a native of Berlin, started his career with Basketball Bundesliga (BBL) club Alba Berlin. In 2019, he was named BBL Best German Young Player. Wagner has played for the German youth national teams, winning a gold medal at the 2018 Albert Schweitzer Tournament. 

His older brother Moritz Wagner, a former Michigan standout, also plays for the Orlando Magic.

Recruiting
Wagner was considered a four-star recruit by 247Sports and Rivals. Among the NCAA Division I programs that recruited him were Butler, Michigan, and Stanford. On July 6, 2019, Wagner committed to play college basketball for Michigan under head coach Juwan Howard. In doing so, he turned down an opportunity to sign a professional contract with Alba Berlin.

College career
On October 21, 2019, Wagner fractured his right wrist and was expected to miss four to six weeks. He made his season debut for the Wolverines on November 27, 2019, and finished the game with six points, three rebounds, and one block in 23 minutes in an 83–76 victory over Iowa State in the quarterfinals of the Battle 4 Atlantis. On December 6, Wagner posted a career-high 18 points in a 103–91 victory over Iowa in its Big Ten Conference season opener, as Michigan had six double-digit scorers, including all five starters. On March 1, 2020, Wagner posted 18 points and 10 rebounds for his first career double-double in a 63–77 loss to Ohio State. Following the regular season, he was named to the 2020 Big Ten All-Freshman team.

During his sophomore season, Wagner posted 14 double-figure games and four 20+ point games, he averaged 13.0 points per game with 6.3 rebounds, a team-high 30 steals and a second-best 23 blocks. Following the season he was named second-team All-Big Ten by the coaches and third-team by the media.  On May 4, 2021, he declared for the 2021 NBA draft forgoing his remaining college eligibility.

Professional career

Alba Berlin (2017–2019)
In the 2018–19 season, Wagner played on a dual contract for both Alba Berlin in the Basketball Bundesliga (BBL), top German league, and SSV Lokomotive Bernau in the third-tier ProB league. In May 2019, he won the BBL Best Young Player Award. In Game 2 of the BBL Finals against Bayern Munich, Wagner scored a team-high 14 points, making all six of his shots. By the end of the season, he was averaging 4.6 points in 12.4 minutes per game in the BBL and played limited minutes in the EuroCup.

Orlando Magic (2021–present)
Wagner was selected with the eighth pick in the 2021 NBA draft by the Orlando Magic. He and fellow lottery pick Jalen Suggs signed with the Magic on August 3. Wagner posted his first NBA double-double with a career-high 11 rebounds and 14 points as well as 6 assists on December 18 against the Brooklyn Nets. On December 27, 2021, Wagner put up a career-high 38 points in a 127–110 loss to the Milwaukee Bucks. Wagner was named the NBA Eastern Conference Rookie of the Month for games played in December. Wagner's second NBA double-double occurred on January 12, 2022 against the Washington Wizards when he upped his career-high assist plateau from 6 to 10 and added 14 points. This marked the first time a Magic rookie forward had ever posted 10 or more assists in a game. Following the 2021–22 NBA season he was named to the NBA All-Rookie First Team.

On November 5, 2022, Wagner scored a season-high 31 points and recorded six assists in a 126–123 overtime loss to the Sacramento Kings. On December 29, he was suspended by the NBA for one game without pay due to coming off the bench during an altercation in a game against the Detroit Pistons the day before.

National team career

Wagner played for Germany at the 2017 FIBA U16 European Championship in Podgorica, Montenegro. In five games, he averaged 7.4 points per game as his team finished in 13th place. In 2018, Wagner averaged six points per game and helped Germany win the gold medal at the Albert Schweitzer Tournament, an under-18 competition in Mannheim, Germany. In the 2019 FIBA U18 European Championship in Volos, Greece, he averaged 13 points and 4.8 rebounds per game, leading his team to 11th place. He missed one game with a back injury. In EuroBasket 2022, he averaged 16.1 points and 4 rebounds per game, beating Poland in his home city of Berlin to take home bronze for Germany.

Honours
 BBL Best Young Player Award: 2018–19

 NBA All Rookie 1st Team 2021-22:

Career statistics

NBA

|-
| style="text-align:left;"|
| style="text-align:left;"|Orlando
| 79 || 79 || 30.7 || .468 || .354 || .863 || 4.5 || 2.9 || .9 || .4 || 15.2
|- class="sortbottom"
| style="text-align:center;" colspan="2"|Career
| 79 || 79 || 30.7 || .468 || .354 || .863 || 4.5 || 2.9 || .9 || .4 || 15.2

College

|-
| style="text-align:left;"|2019–20
| style="text-align:left;"|Michigan
| 27 || 27 || 30.8 || .452 || .311 || .833 || 5.6 || 1.0 || 1.3 || .6 || 11.6
|-
| style="text-align:left;"|2020–21
| style="text-align:left;"|Michigan
| 28 || 28 || 31.7 || .477 || .343 || .835 || 6.5 || 3.0 || 1.3 || 1.0 || 12.5
|- class="sortbottom"
| style="text-align:center;" colspan="2"|Career
| 55 || 55 || 31.2 || .465 || .325 || .835 || 6.1 || 2.0 || 1.3 || .8 || 12.0

Personal life
Wagner is the younger brother of National Basketball Association (NBA) player Moritz Wagner who is his teammate on the Orlando Magic. Moritz played three seasons of college basketball for Michigan and was a first-round pick in the 2018 NBA draft.

References

External links

 Michigan Wolverines bio

2001 births
Living people
Alba Berlin players
Basketball players from Berlin
German expatriate basketball people in the United States
German men's basketball players
National Basketball Association players from Germany
Michigan Wolverines men's basketball players
Orlando Magic draft picks
Orlando Magic players
Shooting guards